Bahia State University (UNEB) is a public university in the Brazilian state of Bahia.

Founded in 1983, the university regrouped existing schools in the state of Bahia. The university is included Technical Education Center of Bahia, the Faculty of Agronomy of the Middle San Francisco (Brazilian river), the schools of education of Alagoinhas, Jacobina, and Santo Antônio de Jesus, and the Faculties of Philosophy, Sciences and Letters of Caetité a Juazeiro.

Academics

Rankings
Maximum Score in student participation

Quacquarelli Symonds uses its own methodology to carry out the study, with data collection in higher education institutions and to data provided by the Organization for Economic Cooperation and Development (OCED), which brings together 34 countries worldwide.

The QS evaluates issues such as academic reputation – are applied 15,000 questionnaires with academic – employability reputation (evaluates the image with companies and government agencies employers of graduates), titration of teachers, published articles, citations in academic papers, impact on internet in addition to the degree of participation and student satisfaction regarding the university.

In this last criterion – participation and satisfaction of students – the UNEB even more highlights: Could maximum score (100 points) reaching the top position among the university in Brazil and the fourth place among the institutions in Latin America.

"Our university has been reaching achievements that are relevant. This leading position is also the result of the participation and mobilization of the student segment, which has been fighting for a public university quality. The entire university body is to be congratulated, but we can not accommodate us because we still have many more achievements ahead", said Marcelo Lemos, general coordinator of the Central Directory of Students (DCE) of UNEB.

Research and postgraduate
The university also took the lead in Bahia in the issue citations in academic papers, leaving the Ufba second. Among the Latin institutions the UNEB figure in 31st place.

According to the Dean of Graduate Studies (PPG), José Cláudio Rocha, the result shows the growth of the institution's investments in research.
"The quality of work undertaken within the university is growing every day. We are evolving much in the scientific literature and began to figure prominently in international studies, "celebrated José Cláudio.

The ex-rector Lourisvaldo Valentim also held the prominent position of UNEB the ranking QS Top Universities, congratulating the joint efforts of the entire academic community in the 24 campuses of the university to this result.
"We are all to be congratulated. Students, teachers, researchers, servers and managers, all contribute their part to this significant growth of our institution ", celebrated Valentim.

The rector also highlighted some numbers that explain the development of UNEB, "Since 2006, we invested more than R $35 million in research and strict post-graduate studies, increasing the number of masters and doctoral degrees, as well as enough enlarge the areas of research ".
Currently the university has 200 research groups on all campuses totaling 1 200 researchers. In just over five years UNEB also jumped a sensu graduate strict 12 master's degrees and offered three doctorates.

Divisions
Salvador Campus I
Salvador Campus-I have following four departments.
Department of Humanities (DCH)
Department of Life Sciences (DCV)
Department of Education (DEDC)
Department of Exact Sciences and Earth (DCET)

Alagoinhas Campus II
Department of Education (DEDC)
Department of Exact Sciences and Earth (DCET)

Juazeiro Campus III
Department of Humanities (DCH)
Department of Technology and Social Sciences (DCTS)

Jacobina Campus IV
Department of Humanities (DCH)

Santo Antônio de Jesus Campus V
Department of Humanities (DCH)

Caetité Campus VI
Department of Humanities (DCH)

Senhor do Bonfim Campus VII
Department of Education (DEDC)

Paulo Afonso Campus VIII
Department of Humanities (DCH)

Barreiras Campus IX
Department of Humanities (DCH)

Teixeira de Freitas Campus X
Department of Education (DEDC)

Serrinha Campus XI
Department of Education (DEDC)

Guanambi Campus XII
Department of Education (DEDC)

Itaberaba Campus XIII
Department of Education (DEDC)

Conceição do Coité Campus XIV
Department of Education (DEDC)

Valença Campus XV
Department of Education (DEDC)

Irecê Campus XVI
Department of Humanities and Technologies (DCHT)

Bom Jesus da Lapa Campus XVII
Department of Humanities and Technologies (DCHT)

Eunapólis Campus XVIII
Department of Humanities and Technologies (DCHT)

Camaçari Campus XIX
Department of Humanities and Technologies (DCHT)

Brumado Campus XX
Department of Humanities and Technologies (DCHT)

Ipiaú Campus XXI
Department of Humanities and Technologies (DCHT)

Euclides da Cunha Campus XXII
Department of Humanities and Technologies (DCHT)

Seabra Campus XXIII
Department of Humanities and Technologies (DCHT)

Xique-Xique Campus XXIV
Department of Humanities and Technologies (DCHT)

See also
Southwest Bahia State University (UESB)
Rankings of universities in Brazil
Universities and Higher Education in Brazil

References

External links

  (English)

Educational institutions established in 1983
Bahia State University
1983 establishments in Brazil
State universities in Brazil